Ho-3 was a Japanese autocannon used during World War II. It was a drum-fed improvement of the magazine-fed Ho-1 cannon, itself derived from the Type 97 antitank rifle.

Specifications
Caliber: 20 mm (0.8 in)
Ammunition: 20 x 125 (164 g)
Weight: 43 kg (95 lb)
Rate of fire: 300-400 rounds/min
Muzzle velocity: 820 m/s (2,690 ft/s)

20 mm artillery
Autocannon
Aircraft guns